The Saint Andrew's Society of Montreal is a non-profit organization based in Montreal dedicated to celebrating Scottish heritage. It was founded in 1835.

It was established with the stated aims of “regulating charity in a systematic manner” and “to advance the cause and welfare of Scotsmen and their descendants”. It provides funding to various groups associated with Scottish culture, promotes activities that reflect Scottish traditions and provides financial assistance to persons in need. The society also offered scholarships to students of Scottish descent.

The first president of the Society was Peter McGill, who was also the second mayor of Montreal. In 1849, following the passing of the Rebellion Losses Bill, the Society took the extraordinary step of removing the Governor General of Canada of the time, Lord Elgin, from its membership; the Governor General had formerly been a patron of the society. In 1857, the Society established St. Andrew's Home to provide a place to stay for new emigrants and other homeless Scots.

The Society operates an annual charity ball described as " one of Montréal's finest society events of the year". It also sponsors an annual fundraising event WhiskyFête, which supports a chair in Scottish Studies at McGill University. It provides a travel grant to the Centre for Scottish Studies at the University of Guelph.

Presidents of St. Andrew's Society of Montreal 

Source:

References 

Canadian people of Scottish descent
Non-profit organizations based in Quebec
1835 establishments in Lower Canada
Organizations based in Montreal
Ethnic fraternal orders in Canada